The Abyssinian scimitarbill (Rhinopomastus minor) is a species of bird in the family Phoeniculidae.
It is found in Djibouti, Ethiopia, Kenya, Somalia, South Sudan, Tanzania, and Uganda. The Abyssinian scimitarbill is known to be insectivorous like other members of the Phoeniculidae family. They have also been observed to have their nests parasitized by the greater honeyguide (Indicator indicator) species of bird.

Gallery

References

 Dangerfield, G., & Turner, D. A. (2016). The breeding of Abyssinian scimitarbill rhinopomastus minor and red-throated Tit Parus Fringillinus in nest boxes in the Central Rift Valley of Kenya. Scopus: Journal of East African Ornithology. Retrieved March 16, 2023, from https://www.ajol.info/index.php/scopus/article/view/139745

Abyssinian scimitarbill
Birds of East Africa
Birds of the Horn of Africa
Abyssinian scimitarbill
Taxonomy articles created by Polbot